Donald Warren Iwerks (born July 24, 1929) is an American former Disney executive and co-founder of Iwerks Entertainment along with former Disney executive Stan Kinsey. He is the son of the animator Ub Iwerks (Walt Disney's original business partner and co-creator of Mickey Mouse and Oswald the Lucky Rabbit) and father of Oscar-nominated documentary film producer Leslie Iwerks.

Career
In 1950, Iwerks joined the Disney company in the machine shop as a technician.

In 1954, Iwerks worked as a camera technician for the film 20,000 Leagues Under the Sea, starring Kirk Douglas and Peter Lorre. He spent the next 30 years driving film innovations for the Disney company. Notable contributions include the first 360 film techniques, 360-degree camera, and first Circle-Vision 360 film, America the Beautiful, and developing the process for creating seamless live action shots with animated backgrounds.

In 1985, after nearly 35 years at Disney, Iwerks left to form his own company called Iwerks Entertainment. Iwerks became a leading developer of special films, special venues, and virtual reality theaters throughout the world.

In 2019, Iwerks published a book titled Walt Disney’s Ultimate Inventor about father Ub Iwerks, his career, and his relationship with Walt Disney.

Awards
On March 23, 1998, at the 70th Academy Awards show, Iwerks received an Oscar. He was awarded the Gordon E. Sawyer Award, which is given each year by the Academy of Motion Picture Arts and Sciences to "an individual in the motion picture industry whose technological contributions have brought credit to the industry."

On March 21, 1999, at the 71st Academy Awards show, an Oscar for Scientific and Technical Achievement was presented to Iwerks Entertainment for an innovation called the Iwerks 8/70 Linear Loop projection system.

In 2009, Iwerks was inducted by Robert A. Iger and Roy E. Disney as a Disney Legend, honoring him as an individual whose "imagination, talents and dreams have created the Disney magic."

References

Further reading 
 Don Iwerks, Walt Disney’s Ultimate Inventor (Disney Editions, 2019)

External links
 SimEx-Iwerks Entertainment
 

Living people
1929 births
American animators
American people of Frisian descent
Disney people
Recipients of the Gordon E. Sawyer Award